The  Golden Sheaf Award for best Emerging Filmmaker production is presented by the Yorkton Film Festival.

History
In 1947 the Yorkton Film Council was founded.  In 1950 the first Yorkton Film Festival was held in Yorkton, Saskatchewan, Canada.  During the first few festivals, the films were adjudicated by audience participation through ballot casting and winners were awarded Certificates of Merit by the film festival council.  In 1958 the film council established the Yorkton Film Festival Golden Sheaf Award for the category Best of Festival, awarded to the best overall film of the festival.  Over the years various additional categories were added to the competition.

In 2006 the Golden Sheaf Award for best Emerging Filmmaker production was added to the Accompanying Categories of the film festival competition.  The winner of this award is determined by a panel of jurors, selected by the film council.  The Emerging Filmmaker Award is given to the director for recognition of the filmmaker's first professional production. This award is open to any genre.  Emerging Filmmaker can be awarded "to a filmmaker (specifically a director) in recognition of his/her first professional production in any genre."  As of 2020, the Golden Sheaf Award categories included: Main Entry Categories, Accompanying Categories, Craft Categories, and Special Awards.

Winners

2000s

2010s

References 

Awards established in 2006
Yorkton Film Festival awards